DYAG (1125 AM) Hapi Radio is a radio station owned and operated by Cadiz Radio and TV Network. Its studio and transmitter are located along Santan St., Brgy. Poblacion 2, Sagay, Negros Occidental.

References

Radio stations established in 1995
Radio stations in Negros Occidental